Folkstudio was a musical club and a record label located in Rome, Italy.

In January 1963, a then little known Bob Dylan performed in the club. In 1967, Bradley returned to the United States and the club management passed to the chemist and music lover Giancarlo Cesaroni. Initially focusing on jazz and blues artists, during the years it gradually hosted artists belonging to other styles and new tendencies. In 1971, it moved from Via Garibaldi to the library L'Uscita, in Via dei Banchi Vecchi, and eventually moved to Via Sacchi, Trastevere.

During the 1970s, the club actively contributed to the launch of several artists' careers, particularly singer-songwriters, including Antonello Venditti, Francesco De Gregori, Rino Gaetano, Mimmo Locasciulli, Stefano Rosso, Gianni Togni, Sergio Caputo, Grazia Di Michele, Mario Castelnuovo.

References

External links
 Folkstudio at Discogs

1961 establishments in Italy
Nightclubs in Italy
Music venues in Italy
Record labels established in 1961
Italian record labels